Charles Willy Kayser (28 January 1881 – 10 July 1942) was a German film actor.

He was born in Metz, Lorraine, Germany (now, Moselle, France) and died at the age of 61 in 1942.

Selected filmography

 Anita Jo (1919)
 The Clan (1920)
 Va banque (1920)
 The House of Torment (1921)
 The Black Spider (1921)
 Miss Venus (1921)
 Miss Beryll (1921)
 The Eternal Curse (1921)
 Deceiver of the People (1921)
 Count Festenberg (1922)
 The Marriage of Princess Demidoff (1922)
 Dance of Passions (1922)
 The Golden Net (1922)
 Circus People (1922)
 The Blonde Geisha (1923)
 Slaves of Love (1924)
 Playing with Destiny (1924)
 Spring Awakening (1924)
 The Prince and the Maid (1924)
 Oh Those Glorious Old Student Days (1925)
 War in Peace (1925)
 Love's Joys and Woes (1926)
 The Eleven Schill Officers (1926)
 The Red Mouse (1926)
 Our Emden (1926)
 The Villa in Tiergarten Park (1927)
 The Vice of Humanity (1927)
 On the Banks of the River Weser (1927)
 The Lorelei (1927)
 Did You Fall in Love Along the Beautiful Rhine? (1927)
 Waterloo (1929)
 Masks (1929)
 Everyone Asks for Erika (1931)
 The Song of the Nations (1931)
 Victoria and Her Hussar (1931)
 Cruiser Emden (1932)
 Chauffeur Antoinette (1932)
 Trenck (1932)
 The Grey Lady (1937)
 The Beaver Coat (1937)
 Red Orchids (1938)
 The Tiger of Eschnapur (1938)
 Fasching (1939)
 The Girl from Barnhelm (1940)
 The Eternal Spring (1940)
 Enemies (1940)
 Comrades (1941)
 Venus on Trial (1941)

External links

1881 births
1942 deaths
German male film actors
German male silent film actors
Actors from Metz
20th-century German male actors